Chengbei is a town in the Meijiang District, Meizhou, Guangdong, People's Republic of China. , it has administrative responsibility for five residential communities and 20 villages.

See also 
 List of township-level divisions of Guangdong

References 

Towns in Guangdong
Meizhou